The canton of Ossun is an administrative division of the Hautes-Pyrénées department, southwestern France. Its borders were not modified at the French canton reorganisation which came into effect in March 2015. Its seat is in Ossun.

It consists of the following communes:
 
Averan
Azereix
Barry
Bénac
Gardères
Hibarette
Juillan
Lamarque-Pontacq
Lanne
Layrisse
Loucrup
Louey
Luquet
Orincles
Ossun
Séron
Visker

References

Cantons of Hautes-Pyrénées